is a Japanese cyclist, who currently rides for UCI Continental team . He won the Japanese National Road Race Championships in 2021.

Major results

2014
 2nd Time trial, National Junior Road Championships
 3rd  Time trial, Asian Junior Road Championships
2017
 10th Road race, Asian Under-23 Road Championships
 4th Road race, National Under-23 Road Championships
2nd Team time trial
2021
 1st  Road race, National Road Championships

References

External links

1996 births
Living people
Japanese male cyclists
People from Kasugai, Aichi